is a Japanese film director. He was the movie-maker of two films featured in the Akihabara Trilogy.

Filmography

 Pretty Maid Café
 Cat Girl Kiki

External links

References

Japanese film directors
Living people
Year of birth missing (living people)